Māris Bogdanovičs (born 19 November 1991 in Dobele) is a Latvian cyclist, who most recently rode for UCI Continental team .

Major results

2014
 3rd Mayor Cup
 7th Central European Tour Budapest GP
 7th Banja Luka–Belgrade II
2015
 9th Odessa Grand Prix 1
2016
 1st  Overall Baltic Chain Tour
1st  Points classification
1st Stage 2
 2nd Tour of Yancheng Coastal Wetlands
 5th Vuelta a La Rioja
 8th Memoriał Henryka Łasaka
 9th Overall Tour of Estonia
2017
 Tour of Fuzhou
1st  Points classification
1st Stages 2 & 5
 Tour of China II
1st  Points classification
1st Stages 5
 2nd Overall Baltic Chain Tour
1st Stage 1
 5th Overall Dookoła Mazowsza
 5th Puchar Ministra Obrony Narodowej
 6th Overall Tour of Estonia
 6th Memorial Grundmanna I Wizowskiego
2019
 1st Stage 2 Tour de Tochigi

References

External links

1991 births
Living people
Latvian male cyclists
European Games competitors for Latvia
Cyclists at the 2019 European Games